The Sport Copter Lightning is an American autogyro, designed and produced by Sport Copter of Scappoose, Oregon. The aircraft is supplied as a kit for amateur construction.

Design and development
It features a single main rotor, a single-seat open cockpit without a windshield, tricycle landing gear and a twin cylinder, air-cooled, two-stroke, single-ignition  Rotax 503 engine in pusher configuration.

The aircraft fuselage is made from bolted-together aluminum tubing. Its  diameter rotor is supplied ready-made and constructed from bonded dural aluminum by the company's subsidiary Sport USA LLC. The landing gear includes telescopic spring suspension. A semi-enclosed cockpit fairing with windshield is optional.

The basic Lightning design has been developed into the heavier Vortex.

Reviewer Andre Cliche said of the Lightning: "In flight, the Lightning is forgiving and easy to maneuver, with light, geared-down controls. It is responsive but not tricky. It is a good choice for beginners."

Variants
Lightning
Base model powered by a  Rotax 503 engine. Optional cockpit fairing. 53 examples had been completed and flown by 2005.
Vortex
Improved model powered by a  Rotax 582 or  Rotax 912UL engine. Cockpit fairing is standard. 124 examples had been completed and flown by 2005.

Specifications (Lightning)

References

External links

1990s United States sport aircraft
Homebuilt aircraft
Single-engined pusher autogyros